Phemeranthus parviflorus, commonly called sunbright or prairie fame flower, is a species of flowering plant in the montia family (Montiaceae). It is native to North America, where it is found in the central and eastern United States and northern Mexico. Its natural habitat is in dry, sandy or rocky areas, typically on acidic substrates. Over its extensive range, it is found various communities such as grasslands, open woodlands, glades, mountain slopes, and bluffs. 

Phemeranthus parviflorus is an herbaceous perennial. Its leaves are linear and succulent. It produces reddish-pink to reddish-purple flowers from May to September.

References

Montiaceae
Flora of North America